Luis Enrique Machado Mora (born 22 December 1991) is a Uruguayan footballer who plays for Deportivo Maldonado.

National
He has been capped by the Uruguay national under-20 football team for the 2011 South American Youth Championship and for the pre-squad for the 2011 FIFA U-20 World Cup.

U20 International goals

|- bgcolor=#DFE7FF
| 1. || 10 September 2010 || Estadio Municipal de La Pintana, Santiago, Chile ||  || 0–2 || 2–3 || Friendly
|- bgcolor=#DFE7FF
| 2. || 5 October 2010 || Parque Capurro, Montevideo, Uruguay ||  || 1–1 || 1–1 || Friendly
|- bgcolor=#DFE7FF
| 3. || 18 October 2010 || Estadio Atanasio Girardot, Medellín, Colombia ||  || 0–1 || 1–2 || Copa Alcaldía de Medellín
|- bgcolor=#DFE7FF
| 4. || 18 October 2010 || Estadio Atanasio Girardot, Medellín, Colombia ||  || 0–2 || 1–2 || Copa Alcaldía de Medellín
|- bgcolor=#DFE7FF
| 5. || 7 May 2011 || Suwon Sports Complex, Suwon, South Korea ||  || 1–2 || 2–2 || 2011 Suwon Cup
|- bgcolor=#DFE7FF
| 6. || 9 May 2011 || Suwon World Cup Stadium, Suwon, South Korea ||  || 1–1 || 1–1 || 2011 Suwon Cup
|}

References

1991 births
Living people
Uruguayan footballers
Uruguayan Primera División players
Uruguayan Segunda División players
Tacuarembó F.C. players
C.A. Cerro players
El Tanque Sisley players
Rampla Juniors players
S.D. Aucas footballers
Deportivo Maldonado players
Footballers from Paysandú
Association football forwards
Uruguayan expatriate footballers
Expatriate footballers in Ecuador
Uruguayan expatriate sportspeople in Ecuador